Tired Theodore may refer to:

Tired Theodore (1936 film), a German film directed by Veit Harlan
Tired Theodore (1945 film), a Swedish film directed by Anders Henrikson
Tired Theodore (1957 film), a West German film directed by Géza von Cziffra
Tired Theodore (1965 film), a West German TV film directed by Erich Neureuther